ʻAbd al-Mannān (ALA-LC romanization of ) is a Muslim male given name and, in modern usage, surname. It is built from the Arabic words ʻabd meaning 'servant' and al-Mannān, "Benefactor, the Giver of All Good/Benefits". The full name means "servant of the Benevolent/Benefactor", "servant of the Giver of All Good/Benefits", and is a Muslim theophoric name.

It may refer to:

Persons
Abu Bakr II ibn `Abd al-Munan (ruled 1829–1852), emir of Harar (Ethiopia)
Sheikh Abdul Mannan (1920s–1971), Bangladeshi journalist
Abdul Mannan (politician) (1929–2005), Bangladeshi politician and minister of Home Affairs from Tangail
Abdul Mannan (academic) (1932–2007), Bangladeshi academic, 19th Vice-Chancellor of the University of Dhaka
M. A. Mannan (neurologist) (1932–2016), Bangladeshi educator, neurologist and politician of Awami League from Kishoreganj
Abdul Mannan (Bangladeshi politician) (1935–2006), Bangladeshi religious and political leader from Comilla
Abdul Mannan (aviation executive) (1942–2020), Bangladeshi politician and minister from Dhaka
Abdul Mannan (politician, born 1942), Bangladeshi politician of Bikalpa Dhara party from Laxmipur
Abdul Mannan Bhuiyan (1943–2010), Bangladeshi politician of Bangladesh Nationalist Party from Narsingdi
Abdul Mannan Syed (1943–2010), Bangladeshi poet and author
Abdul Mannan (politician, born 1944), also Professor Abdul Mannan, Bangladeshi politician from Meherpur and television personality
Muhammad Abdul Mannan (born 1946), Bangladeshi politician from Sunamganj and the incumbent minister of Planning
Abdul Mannan Choudhury (born 1948), Bangladeshi academic, founder and vice-chancellor of World University of Bangladesh
Abdul Manan Ismail (1948–2018), Malaysian politician
Abdul Mannan Hossain (1952–2017), Indian politician
Abdul Mannan Khan (born 1952), Bangladeshi politician from Dhaka and the former State Minister of Housing and Public Works
Abdul Mannan (politician, born 1952), Bangladeshi politician from Jhenaidah
Abdul Mannan (West Bengal politician) (born 1952), Indian National Congress politician
Abdul Mannan (politician, born 1953) (1953–2020), Bangladeshi politician from Bogra
Eddy Helmi Abdul Manan (born 1979), Malaysian footballer
Abdul Mannan (cricketer) (born 1988), Pakistani cricketer
Abdul Mannan (educator), Bangladeshi academic and university administrator, former vice-chancellor of Chittagong University
M. A. Mannan (1950-2022), Bangladeshi politician and former mayor of Gazipur City
Abdul Mannan Talukder, Bangladeshi politician from Sirajganj

References

Arabic masculine given names